The 2011–12 Marquette Golden Eagles men's basketball team represented Marquette University in the 2011–12 NCAA Division I men's basketball season. Marquette was coached by Buzz Williams and played their home games at the Bradley Center in Milwaukee, Wisconsin. The Golden Eagles were members of the Big East Conference. The Golden Eagles finished the season 26–7, 14–4 in Big East play to finish in second place. (Syracuse, the winner of the Big East regular season, was forced to vacate its wins from the season due to NCAA violations.) The Eagles received an at-large bid to the NCAA tournament where they defeated BYU and Murray State to advance to the Sweet Sixteen for the second consecutive year. There they lost to Florida.

Previous season 
The Golden Eagles finished the 2010–11 season 22–15, 9–9 in Big East play to finish in a three-way tie for ninth place. They received an at-large bid to the NCAA tournament where they advanced to the Sweet Sixteen before losing to North Carolina.

Preseason
On October 19, 2011, at Big East Media Day, Marquette was picked to finish in sixth place in the Big East Preseason Coaches' Poll, receiving 155 points. Darius Johnson-Odom was named to the Preseason All-Big East First Team, while Jae Crowder was an honorable mention.

Roster

2011 Paradise Jam

Marquette traveled to St. Thomas for the Paradise Jam tournament in mid-November. Marquette had an easy path to the final game, then were tested. In the opening round, Marquette took on Winthrop, and won easily 95–73, behind 26 points from Vander Blue, who hit his first nine shots, which included two three-point attempts.  
In the semifinal round, Marquette again won easily, beating Ole Miss 96–66. In this game, Jae Crowder hit nine of eleven field goal attempts, and ended with 25 points. Norfolk State also won their first two game in the tournament, so the two teams faced each other for the tournament championship. Marquette had played Norfolk State just a week earlier in Milwaukee, in a game that was never in doubt. Marquette opened up a 6–0 lead, expanded the lead to eleven by halftime, then scored 59 points in the second half to win the game 99–68.

When the two teams met in the Paradise Jam final, the game started out similarly to the early game, with Marquette never trailing, and reaching a nine point lead at halftime. However, instead of scoring 59 points in the second half, they would score only 59 points in the game. The Golden Eagles, ranked 16th in the AP poll, held a 14 point lead at one time, but Norfolk State had two 7–0 runs and tied up the game at 57 points apiece with just over two minutes left. Marquette scored to take a lead; Norfolk State had a chance to tie in the closing seconds but failed to hit the basket, and Marquette won the 2011 Paradise Jam Championship 59–57.

Schedule and results

|-
!colspan=9 style=| Non-conference regular season

|-
!colspan=9 style=|Big East regular season

|-
!colspan=9 style=|Big East tournament 

|-
!colspan=9 style=| NCAA tournament

Rankings

*AP does not release post-NCAA tournament rankings

Notes

Marquette Golden Eagles
Marquette Golden Eagles men's basketball seasons
Marquette
Marquette
Marquette